Odessa College is a public junior college in Odessa, Texas. The college serves the people of Ector County and the Permian Basin.  It was established in 1946 and enrolled 8,024 students in Fall 2021 and 7,679 students in Spring 2022 in its university-parallel and occupational/technical courses, and 11,000 students annually in its Basic Education, Continuing Education, and Community Recreation courses.

History
Odessa College was founded in 1946 as Odessa Junior College. The college dropped "Junior" from its name around 1976.

As defined by the Texas Legislature, the official service area of Odessa College is the following:
all of Andrews, Brewster, Crane, Culberson, Jeff Davis, Loving, Presidio, Reeves, Upton, Ward, and Winkler counties, and the Seminole Independent School District, located in Gaines County.  

The Pecos Technical Training Center is an extension of Odessa College, located at 1000 S. Eddy St, Pecos, Texas. It first opened its doors in the summer of 1999.

Odessa Junior College was featured in the Supreme Court case Perry v. Sindermann, 408 U.S. 593 (1972).

In 1999, an Odessa doctor and his wife donated a  building in Pecos to house the new Pecos Technical Training Center of Odessa College. After renovations to the building made possible by an $860,000 Economic Development Administration grant, the center now houses administrative and faculty offices, technical and vocational learning labs and a student lounge. The new center enables Odessa College to improve and expand its long-established extension education program in Pecos.

In 2011, Odessa College, along with Frank Phillips College in Borger, Ranger College in Ranger, and Brazosport College in Lake Jackson were proposed for closure by the State of Texas. The Texas Association of Community Colleges rallied successfully to keep the four institutions open.

Athletics
Odessa College participates in the Western Junior College Athletic Conference Conference of the National Junior College Athletic Association in multiple sports. To date, the Odessa sports programs have won 46 National Junior College Athletic Association titles, making them the most winning program in the association. 11 sports are currently active: Men's and Women's Basketball, Baseball, Softball, Golf, Rodeo, Men's and Women's Cross Country, Dance, Cheerleaders, and Trainers. In 1970 the women's tennis team won the third national collegiate championship of the United States Lawn Tennis Association. In the first annual National Junior College Golf Tournament on June 2–5, 1959, Odessa College almost made a complete sweep of the honors with Jerry Lackey winning the individual championship with a score of 290 while Les Howard and Melvin Chisum took home the 1st place trophy in the team competition. In 1968 Gail Sykes won the national intercollegiate individual women's golf championship.  During the basketball season, Odessa College broadcasts the men's and women's Western Junior College Athletic Conference road games and the home games with Midland College on the radio.

Notable alumni
Abraham Ancer, professional golfer
Bonner Bolton, Professional Bull Riders, Championship Bull Riding 2007 World Champion, Dancing with The Stars 2017
Craig Ehlo, professional basketball player
Josh Gray, professional basketball player
Larry Johnson, professional basketball player
Rich Loiselle, professional baseball player
Joe Melson, singer and songwriter
Ty Murray, seven-time Professional Rodeo Cowboys Association World All-Around Champion; two-time World Bull Riding Champion, co-founder of the Professional Bull Riders, Dancing with the Stars Season 8, ProRodeo Hall of Fame inductee
Moochie Norris, professional basketball player
Roy Orbison, songwriter and musician
Jim "Razor" Sharp, two-time Professional Rodeo Cowboys Association World Bull Riding Champion, co-founder of the Professional Bull Riders
Stephnie Weir, actress and comedian
Kathy Whitworth, professional golfer

See also
Bill Noël, local industrialist who supported the college

References

External links

Official website

Odessa, Texas
Education in Ector County, Texas
Universities and colleges accredited by the Southern Association of Colleges and Schools
Community colleges in Texas
Buildings and structures in Ector County, Texas
Two-year colleges in the United States
NJCAA athletics
1946 establishments in Texas